LaNotizia (English:  The News) is an Italian-language daily newspaper covering science and technology, economy and politics topics.

Based in Basel, Switzerland, it is owned by S. Publishing.

See also
 Corriere del Ticino
 List of newspapers in Switzerland

References

External links
Official website

Publications with year of establishment missing
Mass media in Basel
Daily newspapers published in Switzerland
Italian-language newspapers published in Switzerland